Roger Jouy (born 21 January 1934) is a French rower. He competed in the men's coxed four event at the 1968 Summer Olympics.

References

1934 births
Living people
French male rowers
Olympic rowers of France
Rowers at the 1968 Summer Olympics
Rowers from Paris